Capital punishment in Iceland was practiced until 1830. Although many were sentenced to death after 1830, their sentences were each commuted. Capital punishment was formally abolished in 1928.

The medieval Icelandic Commonwealth (930–1262), having no central executive powers, did not apply capital punishment.  It was, however, possible for the Althing to declare a man réttdræpur (English: "rightfully killable").  This made the killing of the person in question legal—although the executive power was invested in whosoever cared to pursue it, instead of being the duty of state officials.

History
Capital punishment was not adopted in Iceland until the middle of the 16th century when Danish King Christian III imposed Lutheranism on Icelanders in 1551. Though the first known execution by official laws was not carried out until 1582. Icelanders were made to adopt the Danish legal code, which doled out the death sentence for crimes such as murder and infanticide, but also stealing, sorcery, and bearing children out of wedlock. From 1551 to 1830, approximately 240 individuals were executed in Iceland. Execution methods included beheading, hanging, burning at the stake and drowning. Whereas men were more commonly beheaded or hanged, women were instead lowered into the river directly next to the Law Rock itself with ropes, to either freeze to death or drown.

According to archeologist Steinunn Kristjánsdóttir, women were drowned when found guilty of infanticide, incestuous couples were beheaded, murderers were beheaded, thieves were hanged and individuals found guilty of witchcraft were burned at the stake. Executed individuals lost the right to burial in church cemeteries. Most of those who were executed were vagrants, poor farm hands or women who were alleged to have violated morality codes.

Later, when Iceland fell under the Danish Crown, Danish laws applied, more or less. The frequency of capital punishment increased considerably with the adoption of Lutheranism in the 17th century, but gradually disappeared by the mid-19th century.

Last execution
Iceland last executed capital punishment on January 12, 1830 with the beheading of farm servants Agnes Magnúsdóttir (33) and Friðrik Sigurdsson (19) in Vatnsdalshólar, Húnavatnssýsla. They were accused of the murder of two farmers on March 14, 1828: Natan Ketilsson from Illugastaðir, and Pétur Jónsson from Geitaskarð. After a long trial heard by the Supreme Court in Copenhagen, the pair were sentenced to be executed.

This case inspired the 1995 Icelandic film Agnes by Egill Eðvarðsson and the 2013 novel Burial Rites by Australian writer Hannah Kent.

The last capital punishment sentence took place in 1913, but the sentence was later changed to a prison sentence.

Abolition
Four years later, the last execution of an Icelander was carried out in Denmark.  After 1830, dozens of Icelanders were found guilty of a crime punishable by death.  Most of the cases were infanticides, where women who were unable to care for their newly-born illegitimate children would kill them.  However, they were all granted a clemency by the King of Denmark. In 1869, a new law took effect in Iceland, harmonizing Icelandic and Danish law—this law abolished the death penalty for lesser offenses.  In 1928 the death penalty was abolished entirely, and has not since had a place in Icelandic law.

Since the 1995 revision of the constitution, the reintroduction of capital punishment is unconstitutional.

References

Sources
Hvenær var síðasta aftakan á Íslandi?

Iceland
Legal history of Iceland
Human rights abuses in Iceland
Death in Iceland
Law of Iceland
1869 disestablishments
1928 disestablishments